Maritime Southeast Asia comprises the countries of Brunei, Indonesia, Malaysia, the Philippines, Singapore, and East Timor. Maritime Southeast Asia is sometimes also referred to as Island Southeast Asia, Insular Southeast Asia or Oceanic Southeast Asia. The 16th-century term "East Indies" and the later 19th-century term "Malay Archipelago" are also used to refer to Maritime Southeast Asia.

In Indonesia, the Old Javanese term "Nusantara" is also used as a synonym for Maritime Southeast Asia. The term, however, is nationalistic and has shifting boundaries. It usually only encompasses Peninsular Malaysia, the Sunda Islands, Maluku, and often Western New Guinea and excludes the Philippines.

Stretching for several thousand kilometres, the area features a very large number of islands and boasts some of the richest marine, flora and fauna biodiversity on Earth.

The main demographic difference that sets Maritime Southeast Asia apart from modern Mainland Southeast Asia is that its population predominantly belongs to Austronesian groups. The region contains some of the world's most highly urbanized areas—the Greater Manila Area, Greater Jakarta, Singapore, and Greater Kuala Lumpur—and yet a majority of islands in this vast region remain uninhabited by humans.

Geography

The land and sea area of Maritime Southeast Asia exceeds 2 million km2. These are more than 25,000 islands of the area that comprise many smaller archipelagoes.

The major groupings are:

 Peninsular Malaysia (considered part of Maritime Southeast Asia)
 Singapore, Indonesia, East Timor, East Malaysia and Brunei
 Sunda Islands
 Greater Sunda Islands
 Lesser Sunda Islands
 Maluku Islands
 Philippines
 Visayan Islands
 Sulu Archipelago
 New Guinea and surrounding islands (when included)

The seven largest islands are New Guinea, Borneo, Sumatra, Sulawesi and Java in Indonesia; and Luzon and Mindanao in the Philippines.

In the natural sciences, the region is sometimes known as the Maritime Continent. It also corresponds to the biogeographical region of Malesia (not to be confused with "Malaysia"), with shared tropical flora and fauna.

The climate throughout the archipelago is tropical, owing to its position on the Equator.

Culture and demographics

As of 2017, there were over 540 million people living in the region, with the most populated island being Java. The people living there are predominantly from Austronesian subgroupings and correspondingly speak western Malayo-Polynesian languages. This region of Southeast Asia shares social and cultural ties with both the peoples of mainland Southeast Asia and with other Austronesian peoples in the Pacific. Islam is the predominant religion, with Christianity being the dominant religion in the Philippines and East Timor. Buddhism, Hinduism, and traditional Animism are also practiced among large populations.

Historically, the region has been referred to as part of Greater India, as seen in Coedes' Indianized States of Southeast Asia, which refers to it as "Island Southeast Asia"; and within Austronesia or Oceania, due to shared ethnolinguistic and historical origins of the latter groups (Micronesian and Polynesian groups) being from this region.

History 

The maritime connectivity within the region has been linked to it becoming a distinct cultural and economic area, when compared to the 'mainland' societies in the rest of Southeast Asia. This region stretches from the Yangtze delta in China down to the Malay Peninsula, including the South China Sea, Gulf of Thailand and Java Sea. The region was dominated by the thalassocratic cultures of the Austronesian peoples.

Ancient Indian Ocean trade

The first true maritime trade network in the Indian Ocean was by the Austronesian peoples of Island Southeast Asia. They established trade routes with Southern India and Sri Lanka  as early as 1500 BC, ushering an exchange of material culture (like catamarans, outrigger boats, lashed-lug and sewn-plank boats, and paan) and cultigens (like coconuts, sandalwood, bananas, and sugarcane); as well as connecting the material cultures of India and China. Indonesians, in particular were trading in spices (mainly cinnamon and cassia) with East Africa using catamaran and outrigger boats and sailing with the help of the Westerlies in the Indian Ocean. This trade network expanded to reach as far as Africa and the Arabian Peninsula, resulting in the Austronesian colonization of Madagascar by the first half of the first millennium AD. It continued up to historic times.

Maritime Silk Road 

The ancient Austronesian trade networks was later used by the first Chinese trading fleets of the Song Dynasty at around 900 AD. It led to a renewed flourishing of trade between China and Southeast Asia, now known as the Maritime Silk Road. Demand for Southeast Asian products and trade was partially driven by the increase in China's population in this era, whereby it doubled from 75 to 150 million.

Trade with China ceased after the collapse of the Song Dynasty due to invasions and famine. It was restored during the Ming Dynasty from the 14th to 16th centuries.  The naval expeditions of Zheng He between 1405 and 1431 also played a critical role in opening up of China to increased trade with Southeast Asian polities.

Chinese trade was strictly controlled by the Imperial Court, but the Hokkien diaspora facilitated informal trade and cultural exchange with Southeast Asia, settling among Southeast Asian polities during this time period. Despite not having the official sanction of the Chinese government these communities formed business and trade networks between cities such as Melaka, Hội An and Ayutthaya. Many of these Chinese businesspeople integrated into their new countries, becoming political officials and diplomats.

See also 

 Southeast Asia
 Mainland Southeast Asia
 Brunei Darussalam–Indonesia–Malaysia–Philippines East ASEAN Growth Area
 Philippine archipelago
 Indonesian archipelago
 Farther India
 Greater India
 Greater Indonesia
 Maritime Continent
 Malay race
 Malay world
 Malesia
 Nanyang
 Peninsular Malaysia
 Domesticated plants and animals of Austronesia

References

External links 

 Art of Island Southeast Asia, a full text exhibition catalog from The Metropolitan Museum of Art

 
Geography of Southeast Asia
Regions of Southeast Asia